The Soviet occupation zone ( or , "East Zone"; , Sovetskaya okkupatsionnaya zona Germanii, "Soviet occupation zone of Germany") was an area of Germany in Central Europe that was occupied by the Soviet Union as a communist area, established as a result of the Potsdam Agreement on 1 August 1945. On 7 October 1949 the German Democratic Republic (GDR), commonly referred to in English as East Germany, was established in the Soviet occupation zone.

The SBZ was one of the four Allied occupation zones of Germany created at the end of World War II with the Allied victory. According to the Potsdam Agreement, the Soviet Military Administration in Germany (German initials: SMAD) was assigned responsibility for the middle portion of Germany. Eastern Germany beyond the Oder-Neisse line, equal in territory to the SBZ, was to be annexed by Poland and its population expelled, pending a final peace conference with Germany.

By the time forces of the United States and United Kingdom began to meet Soviet Union forces, forming a Line of contact, significant areas of what would become the Soviet zone of Germany were outside Soviet control.  After several months of occupation these gains by the British and Americans were ceded to the Soviets, by July 1945, according to the previously agreed upon occupation zone boundaries.

The SMAD allowed four political parties to develop, though they were all required to work together under an alliance known as the "Democratic Bloc" (later the National Front). In April 1946, the Social Democratic Party of Germany (SPD) and the Communist Party of Germany (KPD) were forcibly merged to form the Socialist Unity Party which later became the governing party of the GDR.

The SMAD set up ten "special camps" for the detention of Germans, making use of some former Nazi concentration camps.

In 1945, the Soviet occupation zone consisted primarily of the central portions of Prussia. After Prussia was dissolved by the Allied powers in 1947, the area was divided between the German states (Länder) of Brandenburg, Mecklenburg, Saxony, Saxony-Anhalt and Thuringia. On 7 October 1949, the Soviet zone became the German Democratic Republic. In 1952, the Länder were dissolved and realigned into 14 districts (Bezirke), plus the district of East Berlin.

In 1952, with the Cold War political confrontation well underway, Joseph Stalin sounded out the Western Powers about the prospect of a united Germany which would be non-aligned (the "Stalin Note").  The West's disinterest in this proposal helped to cement the Soviet Zone's identity as the GDR for the next four decades.

"Soviet zone" and derivatives (or also, "the so-called GDR") remained official and common names for East Germany in West Germany, which refused to acknowledge the existence of a state in East Germany until 1972, when the government of Willy Brandt extended a qualified recognition under its Ostpolitik initiative.

See also
Allied-occupied Austria
History of East Germany
Bizone
Trizone
Group of Soviet Forces in Germany
Stunde Null

References

 Brennan, Sean, 'Land Reform Propaganda in Soviet Occupied Germany', University of Kent
 Lewkowicz, NicolasThe German Question and the International Order, 1943-48 (Palgrave Macmillan: Basingstoke and New York) (2008)
 Lewkowicz, Nicolas, The German Question and the Origins of the Cold War (IPOC: Milan) (2008)

 
1940s in East Germany
Foreign relations of the Soviet Union
World War II occupied territories
Aftermath of World War II in Germany
 
Soviet military occupations
Germany–Soviet Union relations
States and territories established in 1945
States and territories disestablished in 1949
1945 in Germany
1945 establishments in Europe
1949 disestablishments in Europe